Ooni Adegbalu was the 17th Ooni of Ife, a paramount traditional ruler of Ile Ife, the ancestral home of the Yorubas. He succeeded Ooni Okanlajosin and was succeeded by  
Ooni Osinkola.

References

Oonis of Ife
Yoruba history